Thomas's small-eared shrew (Cryptotis thomasi) is a species of mammal in the family Soricidae. It is found in Colombia, Ecuador, and Peru.

References

Cryptotis
Mammals of Colombia
Mammals of Ecuador
Mammals of Peru
Taxonomy articles created by Polbot
Mammals described in 1897
Taxa named by Clinton Hart Merriam